Patrick Gaffney  (died 1943) was a left-wing Irish politician. A flour miller from County Carlow, he was elected as a Labour Party Teachta Dála (TD) for Carlow–Kilkenny at the 1922 general election. He left Labour to join the Communist Party of Ireland in protest over the Constitution of the Irish Free State's requiring the Oath of Allegiance for all legislators. 

He participated in the Third Dáil when it met as a "Provisional Parliament and Constituent Assembly" in September 1922, but withdrew when it became the Free State Dáil in December as the Constitution came into force and the Oath was required. He stood as a "Republican Labour" candidate in the 1923 general election but was defeated.

References

External links

Year of birth missing
1943 deaths
Labour Party (Ireland) TDs
Irish communists
Members of the 3rd Dáil
Politicians from County Carlow